Opoku is both a given Akan name and a surname. Notable people with the name include:

 Colleen Opoku Amuaben (born 1960), general superintendent
 Dorcas Opoku Dakwa (or Abrewa Nana) (born 1980), Ghanaian singer, songwriter and dancer
 Eric Opoku-Agyemang (or Eric Opoku) (born 1991), Ghanaian footballer
 Jonathan Opoku (born 1990), Dutch professional footballer
 Jordan Opoku (born 1983), Ghanaian footballer
 Joshua Drew Opoku Okoampa (or Joshua Okoampa) (born 1984), American soccer player
 Joshua Otto Opoku (or Joshua Otto) (born 1990), Ghanaian footballer
Kwame Opoku (born 1999), Ghanaian footballer
 Naana Jane Opoku-Agyemang (born 1951), Ghanaian academic
 Nana Opoku Agyemang-Prempeh (or Agyemang Opoku) (born 1989), Ghanaian footballer
 Prince Opoku Bismark Polley Sampene (or Prince Polley) (born 1969), Ghanaian footballer
 Samuel Opoku Nti known as Opoku Nti (born 1961), Ghanaian footballer
Sonia Opoku, Ghanaian footballer
 Stanley Opoku Aborah (or Stanley Aborah) (born 1987), Ghanaian-Belgian professional footballer 
 Richard Opoku Osei (or Richard Osei) (born 1985), Ghanaian footballer
Theophilus Opoku (1842-1913), Akan Basel missionary and teacher

Given name
 Opoku Ware I (1700–1750), Asantehene 
 Opoku Ware II (1919–1999),  fifteenth King of the Empire of Ashanti
 Opoku Afriyie, Ghanaian footballer and manager

Akan given names
Surnames of Akan origin